
Gmina Uście Gorlickie is a rural gmina (administrative district) in Gorlice County, Lesser Poland Voivodeship, in southern Poland, on the Slovak border.

Villages
Gmina Uście Gorlickie contains the villages and settlements of Banica, Blechnarka, Brunary, Czarna, Hańczowa, Huta Wysowska, Izby, Konieczna, Kunkowa, Kwiatoń, Leszczyny, Nowica, Oderne, Przysłup, Regietów, Ropki, Skwirtne, Smerekowiec, Śnietnica, Stawisza, Uście Gorlickie, Wysowa-Zdrój and Zdynia.

Neighbouring gminas
Gmina Uście Gorlickie is bordered by the gminas of Gorlice, Grybów, Krynica-Zdrój, Ropa and Sękowa. It also borders Slovakia.

References
Polish official population figures 2006

Uscie Gorlickie
Gorlice County